O is a water-themed stage production by Cirque du Soleil, a Canadian circus and entertainment company. The show has been in permanent residence at the Bellagio in Las Vegas, Nevada, United States, since October 1998. O, whose name is pronounced the same way as eau, the French word for "water", takes place around and above a  pool of water. It features water acts such as synchronized swimming as well as aerial and ground acts.  The O theatre, which is designed to resemble a 14th-century European opera house, has 1,800 seats, thus allowing the performance to be watched by 3,600 people a night since the performance usually plays twice in a given day, also designed to meet the special demands of the show.

O was inspired by the "infinity and elegance of water's pure form," which pays tribute to the beauty of the theatre. A group of 150 stage technicians assist in the production of the show, the cast of which is 85 performers: international acrobats, synchronized swimmers, and divers. Some of them are former Olympic athletes.

History
Since late October 2010, Cirque du Soleil has offered backstage tours of the O theatre. The experience allows visitors to see the backstage wings, training rooms, costume workshop, break area, underwater lighting area, and go up to a catwalk into the sound and lighting booths.  Not every experience 
will be the same as the tour is conducted around a "regular day", so performers may or may not be training, rehearsing, or even working out.

As of early 2011, O has grossed over a billion dollars since the show opened in 1998.

O has received many awards, including the following:
 Entertainment Design Award, best production show, 1998
 Las Vegas Review-Journal, best production show, 1999–2006
 THEA, live show category, 1999
 Prix Italia, creativity in high definition, 2009, for the documentary Flow

O had its 10,000th performance on 1 September 2019.

Set and technical information
The show has a cast of 85 acrobats, synchronized swimmers and divers performing in and above a 1.5 million-gallon pool. When maintenance needs to be performed, the pool is drained in about 12 hours to the Bellagio Lake, causing the lake's water level to rise . Every member of the cast is scuba-certified.

The underwater stage lift was produced by Handling Specialty.  In order for the platform stage to rise and fall in the water without a wake, the rubber surface of the stage is perforated.

Cold air vents under each seat help control the theatre temperature for the audience. A mesh false ceiling allows warm moist air to escape out of the top of the theatre.

To minimize damage to the musical instruments, the musicians play from glass enclosures in the theatre. Some of the musical instruments used in the show are more than 100 years old. The unique string instrument heard in the soundtrack of O is an erhu, a traditional Chinese bowed string instrument.

To maintain a fresh look on the performers, some performers have multiple sets of costumes so they may reappear dry despite having been in the water.  Some of the costumes only have a lifespan of approximately 20 shows due to the bromide and chlorine in the water.

Additional facts about the show:
 Some of the props function as boats, like the umbrella that Le Vieux rides on the water.
 There are 15 technicians underwater during the show, performing various tasks such as artist handling and props manipulation.
 The horses that the Comets ride in the show weigh .
 Hanging 49 feet above the stage, the carousel and téléphérique (a conveyor system) carry tons of equipment as well as performers during the show.
 Most of the props that are used during the show are actually driven by the Performers who ride them.  For instance, the carousel horses have a small propeller underneath their tails; they are controlled by a joystick located on the back of the horse.

Costumes
Costumes for O drew inspiration from many sources: commedia dell'arte, the Baroque, India, the Arabian Nights, as well as Venetian courtly fashions.  The costumes' silhouettes are defined by the design and are accentuated by the transparency of the selected materials and fabrics.  Many costumes' base design are leotards which are then expounded upon: this includes the Zebras and Flayed Ones, among others.  The Flayed Ones' leotards, for example, originally had hand-painted muscles on them, as digital screen-printing was inaccessible at the time of creation.  Another special attribute critical to costumes in O is their treatment to help withstand the water and chemicals in it.  To achieve this feat, roughly 40% of the costumes have been applied with a specific type of silicon sizing.  In addition, the materials chosen are more durable and had to be able to both mould to the performer's body and dry quickly. Over the years the best fabric found for the costumes has been nylon mesh, which performs well either wet or dry.

Additional facts regarding the costumes:
 A separate room was built with timed heaters and fans to air-dry many of the costumes which cannot be tumble-dried.
 Sixty loads of laundry are done nightly to wash the costumes which can be machine washed.
 The swimmers' costumes are replaced every 3 months. 
 The Comets' costumes last for a full year.
All wigs and headpieces had to have chinstraps added.

Music
The music of O was composed by Benoit Jutras and features a mix of classical Western and world instrumentation, including Chinese violin (erhu), bagpipes, African guitar and harp (kora), Colombian guitar, cello, ancient woodwinds and a wide variety of percussion instruments. During the show, the score is performed by a live band situated behind glass walls above and to the side of the stage. The glass protects the musicians' equipment from moisture damage.

Os music was recorded at the Bellagio and released on November 24, 1998. The album was re-released on September 6, 2005. The songs are listed below with their corresponding act in parentheses.

Album track list (and acts in the show accompanied by each song):
 Jeux d'Eau (Solo and duo trapeze)
 Mer Noire (Barge)
 Tzelma (Interlude from bateau)
 Africa (Interlude from clown act 1)
 Remous (Bateau)
 Svecounia (Interlude from contortion, cerceaux)
 Nostalgie (Intro to russian swings)
 Simcha (Character parade, Russian swings)
 Gamelan (Contortion)
 Ephra (Flying man and cadre)
 Désert (Opening, nage, solo and duo trapeze)
 Terre Aride (Fire)
 O (Finale)

Additional songs in the show not included on the album:
 Danse (Clown act 2) (2001-present)
 Debbie (Journey of Man) (Washington/solo trapeze)
 Festival (Interlude from Fire)
 Sur Terre (Clown act 2) (1998-2000)
 Plouf (High dive)
 La Glace (Clown act 1) (1998-2000)
 Reda Ver.1 (Opening) (1998-2000)
 Reda Ver.2 (Opening) (2001-present)
 Confluence (Interlude from Cerceaux)
 Merou (Washington trapeze) (1998 only) Nenuphar (Intro to contortion) Robinet (Clown act 1) (2001–present) Humoresque No. 7 Opus 101 (Opening Interlude) (1998-2000) Aurora (Opening Interlude) (2001–present)Filmography
In 2007, Cirque du Soleil released the film Flow (A Tribute to the Artists of "O").  The documentary was filmed in the O theatre and by the Colorado River.  The film shows certain artists performing out around the river as well as on stage and provides information on the necessary technical equipment used to produce the performance.  Bonus features of Flow include: performance clips, Russian swing act, technical information and film below the surface of the O pool, and information about the creation of O itself.

In 2009, Flow won the Prix Italia award for the category of Creativity in High Definition.

The following acts were used in Cirque du Soleil: Worlds Away'':
 Synchronised swimming
 Bateau
 Fire
 Duo trapeze
 Contortion
 Aerial hoops

References

External links

 
 Official Bellagio site for O

Cirque du Soleil resident shows
Production shows in the Las Vegas Valley
Las Vegas shows